Nicolas Kiefer was the defending champion, but lost in the quarterfinals this year.

David Prinosil won the title, beating Richard Krajicek 6–3, 6–2 in the final.

Seeds

Draw

Finals

Top half

Bottom half

External links
 Main draw
 ITF tournament edition details

2000 Gerry Weber Open